Azure A is an organic compound with the chemical formula C14H14ClN3S. It is a light blue to dark blue dye.  It is used as a screening test for mucopolysaccharides. It can also be used to stain lysosome in blood smears, and is often used in Giemsa stain.

Thiazine dyes
Chlorides
Phenothiazines